Nathaly Denice Silva (born 15 August 2001) is an American-born Nicaraguan footballer who plays as a forward for college team Long Beach City Vikings and the Nicaragua women's national team.

High school and college career
Silva has attended the Mayfair High School in Lakewood, California and the Long Beach City College in Long Beach, California.

International career
Silva represented Nicaragua at the 2020 CONCACAF Women's U-20 Championship. She capped at senior level during the 2020 CONCACAF Women's Olympic Qualifying Championship qualification.

References 

2001 births
Living people
People with acquired Nicaraguan citizenship
Nicaraguan women's footballers
Women's association football forwards
Nicaragua women's international footballers
American women's soccer players
Long Beach City Vikings athletes
College women's soccer players in the United States
American people of Nicaraguan descent